Zoom is the twelfth studio album by British symphonic rock band Electric Light Orchestra (ELO), released on 12 June 2001 on Epic Records. It was the first official ELO album since 1986's Balance of Power.

Recording
Zoom was recorded primarily by Jeff Lynne alone, with guest musicians including George Harrison and Ringo Starr.  It was one of Harrison's last recordings before his death. The only other ELO member appearing on the album, Richard Tandy, appears on the opening track and performed live in promotional concerts.

Release and reception

The album was the band's first release of new material since Balance of Power, released in 1986. Although billed as a return to the classic ELO sound, the album sales were relatively poor and a planned North American concert tour was cancelled. Upon release, the album charted at number 34 in the UK Albums Chart. In the US, it debuted at number 94 on the Billboard 200 and number 14 on the Billboard Top Internet Albums chart, with around 18,000 copies sold in the United States. As of October 2015, the album had sold 87,000 copies in the US.

The album peaked at number 51 on Austria's Ö3 Austria Top 40 Longplay chart, and number 16 on Germany's Media Control Album Chart. The single from the album Alright peaked at number 87 on the Dutch Top 40 chart in the Netherlands.

A remaster by Frontiers was released on 19 April 2013 in the UK, and on 23 April 2013 in the US, and included four previously unreleased bonus tracks; two of them being live recordings from the 2001 Zoom Tour Live PBS taping at CBS Television City in Los Angeles. The remaster of the Japan-only track, "Long Black Road" (which doesn't appear on the Frontiers release), was included along with "10538 Overture" in the soundtrack for the 2013 film American Hustle.

Track listing

Personnel
Jeff Lynne – Vocals, electric guitars, bass, keyboards, cello ("Melting in the Sun"), drums

Guest musicians
Richard Tandy – Keyboards ("Alright")
George Harrison – Slide guitar ("A Long Time Gone" and "All She Wanted")
Ringo Starr – Drums ("Moment in Paradise" and "Easy Money")
Marc Mann – Rhythm guitar ("Moment in Paradise"), string arrangements ("In My Own Time" and "Melting in the Sun")
 Suzie Katayama – Cello ("Just for Love", "Stranger on a Quiet Street" and "All She Wanted")
 Roger Lebow – Cello ("Lonesome Lullaby")
 Dave Boruff – Saxophone ("A Long Time Gone")
Laura Lynne – Backing vocals ("All She Wanted")
Rosie Vela – Backing vocals ("Alright", "All She Wanted"), spoken parts and Tap dancing ("In My Own Time")
 Kris Wilkinson – String arrangements ("Ordinary Dream")

Charts

Certifications

References

Electric Light Orchestra albums
Albums produced by Jeff Lynne
2001 albums
Epic Records albums